Escuela Cristóbal Colón de la Salle is a private school with three campuses in Gustavo A. Madero, Mexico City. It has one preschool campus and one elementary school campus in Col. Tepeyac Insurgentes, and a middle and high school campus in Col. Siete Maravillas.

References

External links
  Escuela Cristóbal Colón de la Salle

High schools in Mexico City
Gustavo A. Madero, Mexico City